Ceratopogonini is a tribe of biting midges, family Ceratopogonidae.

References 

Ceratopogonidae
Nematocera tribes